Spandau Arsenal was the center for development of military small arms for Imperial Germany from the Industrial Revolution until 1919.  Spandau engineered and tested improved infantry weapons.

History

The Royal Prussian Rifle Factory was established on the river Havel at Potsdam in 1722 by Frederick William I of Prussia. The facility was leased to private manufacturers until machinery was moved upstream to the confluence with river Spree in the westernmost Berlin borough of Spandau about 1850. Early arsenal operations were east of the Spandau Citadel, but the arsenal later expanded into the Renaissance fortress. Spandau became the focus of government small arms production through the Second Industrial Revolution until the arsenal was demilitarized by the Treaty of Versailles in 1919.
Following demilitarization, arsenal machinery was used for manufacture of civilian goods by the state owned conglomerate Deutsche Werke AG. By the 1930s, the arsenal became a laboratory for development of organophosphate insecticides. The citadel became a museum following World War II.

Firearms production
Weapons manufactured at Spandau included:
Potsdam musket 1809
Dreyse needle gun
Mauser Model 1871
Gewehr 1888
Gewehr 98
MG 08

See also
 Deutsche Waffen und Munitionsfabriken, which made many of the German Empire's Maxim guns and other, similar ordnance at Spandau

Sources

Firearm manufacturers of Germany
Arsenals
Spandau